Sean O'Malley (born 4 June 1992), most commonly known by his stage name Seán Óg (meaning Young Seán), is a singer and musician from Milltown Malbay, County Clare, Ireland.

Born into a family of musicians, he started making music on a young age. Like many teenagers he made a combination between studying for his leaving cert and playing in a band.

In 2010 he scored a hit single with "We still love you without your car". The accompanying clip on YouTube was remarkable, due to several dogs playing the instruments.

Singles

References

External links
 

Irish male singers
Living people
Irish rappers
Musicians from County Clare
1992 births
People from Milltown Malbay